Mandiner is a centre-right Hungarian group of news publications including the weekly news magazine Mandiner and the internet portals mandiner.hu and Makronóm.mandiner (makronom.mandiner.hu). The three publications have separate managements. They are published by Mandiner Press Kft, founded in 2017, and belong to the Central European Press and Media Foundation group (KESMA). Mandiner is a successor of a news publication run in the early 2000s by Fidelitas, the youth arm of the Hungarian national-conservative party Fidesz, which has been ruling Hungary since 2010.

The printed weekly version is published since 12 September 2019.

Affiliation
Mandiner identifies itself as national liberal and national conservative. It also uses the word "szabadelvű" to describe its line, which is a special Hungarian version of liberalism stemming from the 19th century. "We are not independent, but we also look at ourselves and the political camp close to us with irony. We believe in the variegation of opinions, freedom, tradition and Hungarian history..." – Mandiner wrote on its Facebook page.

References

External links
Mandiner.hu
Makronóm.mandiner

2019 establishments in Hungary
Hungarian-language magazines
Hungarian news websites
Magazines established in 2019
Magazines published in Budapest
News magazines published in Hungary